Jonathan Bell Morley (29 January 1884 – 1957) was an English professional footballer who played as a winger.

References

1884 births
1957 deaths
Footballers from Carlisle, Cumbria
English footballers
Association football midfielders
Workington A.F.C. players
Sunderland A.F.C. players
Burnley F.C. players
Preston North End F.C. players
English Football League players